Gustafva Röhl (1798–1848), was a Swedish educator.

She was the sister of Maria Röhl. She became a governess after the death of her parents in 1822, and managed a girls' school in Falun.  Her school was widely respected; she was regarded as a progressive educator "both in regard to her knowledge as well as her view on life twenty years before her time" and published several books about education and pedagogy.

Works 
 En liten bok för att bilda små barn i de första begreppen om hvad är rätt och orätt. Falun 1842. 12:o. 12 s. — Uppl. 3: 1847. 
 En liten inledning till catechesen. Falun 1842. 10:o. 20 s. Uppl. 2—4: 1844—48. 
 Första steget till Gamla Testamentets historia. Till läsning för små barn. Falun 1842. 12:o. 28 s. 
 Första steget till Nya Testamentets historia... Falun 1842. 12:o. 50 s.

References

1798 births
1848 deaths
19th-century Swedish educators
Swedish governesses
Women educational theorists
19th-century women educators